Bahira was an Assyrian, likely Nestorian monk from the tribe of Abd al-Qays  who, according to Islamic religion, foretold to the adolescent Muhammad his future as a prophet. His name derives from the Syriac bḥīrā, meaning “tested (by God) and approved”. Christian tradition later appropriated him as Sergius.

Islamic tradition
 
The story of Muhammad's encounter with Bahira occurs in the works of the early Muslim historians Ibn Hisham (died 833 CE), Ibn Sa'd al-Baghdadi (784–855), and Muhammad ibn Jarir al-Tabari (839–923), whose versions differ in some details. The young Muhammad, then either nine or twelve years old, met Bahira in Syria while travelling with a Meccan caravan, accompanying his uncle Abu Talib ibn ‘Abd al-Muttalib. When the caravan passed by his cell, the monk invited the merchants to a feast. They accepted the invitation, leaving the boy to guard the camel. Bahira, however, insisted that everyone in the caravan should come to him. Then a miraculous occurrence indicated to the monk that Muhammad would become a prophet.

When he sat under a tree, its branches moved to shade him, the movement of a cloud kept shadowing Muhammad regardless of the time of the day drew Bahira's attention. The monk revealed his visions of Muhammad's future to the boy's uncle (Abu Talib), warning him to preserve the child from the Jews (in Ibn Sa'd's version) or from the Byzantines (in al-Tabari's version). Both Ibn Sa'd and al-Tabari write that Bahira found the announcement of the coming of Muhammad in the original, unadulterated gospels, which he possessed.

A similar tradition is attributed to Ibn Shihab al-Zuhri in the works of the early ahadith compiler ‘Abd al-Razzaq al-San‘ani, in which the unnamed figure is a rabbi of Tayma instead of a Christian Syrian monk. The rabbi warns Abu Talib against bringing Muhammad to Syria, as he predicts that Muhammad will be killed by the Syrian Jews if they proceed. In response, Abu Talib returned to Mecca with his nephew. Later Islamic writers gave the rabbi the name of Bahira.

Christian tradition
The names and religious affiliations of the monk vary in different Christian sources. For example, John of Damascus (d.749), a Christian writer, states that Muhammad "having chanced upon the Old and New Testaments and likewise, it seems, having conversed with an Arian monk, devised his own heresy."

For Abd-al-Masih al-Kindi, who calls him Sergius and writes that he later called himself Nestorius, Bahira was a Nasorean, a group usually conflated with the Nestorians. After the 9th century, Byzantine polemicists refer to him as Baeira or Pakhyras, both being derivatives of the name Bahira, and describe him as an iconoclast. Sometimes Bahira is called a Syrian Jacobite or an Arian.  The early Christian polemical biographies of Muhammad share in claiming that any supposed illiteracy of Muhammad did not imply that he received religious instruction solely from the angel Gabriel, and often identified Bahira as a secret, religious teacher to Muhammad.

Gallery

Bibliography
 Maulana Muhammad Ali (2002), The Holy Qur'an: Arabic Text with English Translation and Commentary, New Addition, Ahmadiyya Anjuman Isha’ at Islam Lahore Inc., Ohio, USA.
 Osman Kartal (2009), The Prophet’s Scribe  Athena Press, London (a novel)
 B. Roggema, The Legend of Sergius Baḥīrā. Eastern Christian Apologetics and Apocalyptic in Response to Islam (The History of Christian-Muslim Relations. Texts and Studies 9; 2008) (includes editions, translations and further references).
 K. Szilágyi, Muhammad and the Monk: The Making of the Christian Baḥīrā Legend, Jerusalem Studies in Arabic and Islam 34 (2008), in press.
 Abel, A. (1935) “L'Apocalypse de Bahira et la notion islamique du Mahdi” Annuaire de l'Institut de Philologie et d'Histoire Orientale III, 1–12. Alija Ramos, M.

References

External links
 The Byzantine Church Of Buhaira En Bosra Syria

6th-century Christian monks
6th-century Arabs
Life of Muhammad
Precursors in religion
Christianity and Islam
Christian apologetics